Sukanta College, established in 2008, is an undergraduate college in Bhangonkhali, Basanti, West Bengal, India. This college is affiliated with the University of Calcutta. The most prolific student of this college is Rahul Das, political science,  2016 batch, who has won gold medal from Rabindra Bharati University in 2018 in the field of Political Science. He is also the only alumni of this college who has qualified UGC National Eligibility Test and West Bengal State Eligibility Test both in 2018.

Departments

Arts
Bengali
Sanskrit
History
Political Science
English
Arbic
Education

Accreditation
Sukanta College is recognized by the University Grants Commission (UGC).

See also 
List of colleges affiliated to the University of Calcutta
Education in India
Education in West Bengal

References

External links
Sukanta College

Educational institutions established in 2008
University of Calcutta affiliates
Universities and colleges in South 24 Parganas district
2008 establishments in West Bengal